"Can Can" is a song by British 2-tone/ska band Bad Manners, released in June 1981 as the first single from their third album Gosh It's ... Bad Manners. It is an instrumental song, based on the music "Galop infernal" written by French composer Jacques Offenbach which was later adopted as the music for the dance the can-can. The arrangement was credited to Bad Manners. It peaked at number 3 for four weeks on the UK Singles Chart, becoming the band's joint biggest hit with "Special Brew".

Reception 
Reviewing the song for Record Mirror, John Shearlaw wrote "You wouldn't believe that Buster Bloodvessel could keep his (enormous) mouth shut for the length of a single, but that's exactly what he does on this delightful work-out of the theme that launched a thousand Westerns; and one that's a guaranteed hit. Dizzy production, instant appeal and a truly breathtaking piece of opportunism. Lift those legs!".

Track listing 
 "Can Can" – 2:55
 "Armchair Disco" – 3:10

Charts

References 

1981 singles
1981 songs
Magnet Records singles
Bad Manners songs